"What Yo Name Iz?" is the debut single by American rapper Kirko Bangz. The Sound M.O.B. produced song was featured on his mixtape Procrastination Kills 3 (2011). It's also Kirko Bangz's first song to chart on the US Billboard charts.

Remix

Maxrank also made a remix for this song.

Chart performance
"What Yo Name Iz?" was the first song by Kirko Bangz to chart on the billboard charts. It debuted at number 97 on the U.S. Billboard Hot R&B/Hip-Hop Songs on the week of October 23, 2010. It spent 27 weeks on the chart and peaked at number 41.

Charts

References

2011 debut singles
Kirko Bangz songs
Wale (rapper) songs
Big Sean songs
Bun B songs
Warner Records singles